Lollipop was a Taiwanese Mandopop boyband that released two studio albums, two EPs, one single and contributed to two soundtracks.

History 
In 2006, Channel V selected six people for the "Bang Bang Tang" (BBT), Taipei-based variety show. The six members of Lollipop selected and revealed in the  November 27, 2006, episode were Liao Xiao Jie (Liljay/Brian), Qiu Wang Zi (Prince), Zhuang Ao Quan, Yang Xiao Yu (Fabien), Liao Wei Lian (William), and Liu A Wei.

The members signed with Channel V, with Dora Ao as their agent. The group signed with EMI Capitol on December 2, 2006. Lollipop's first public performance was on December 9, 2006, at the V-Power Music Storm Concert.

Their first single, Colorful Lollipop (七彩棒棒堂), was released on January 26, 2007. Two months later, on March 9, 2007, they released an EP and DVD version of their first single, Colorful Lollipop Commemorative Edition (七彩棒棒堂-無敵慶功版). On May 31, 2007, Lollipop released their second EP and DVD, Summer's First Experience (夏日初體驗), which includes a photobook compiled with photos taken in Okinawa, Japan.

On August 31, 2007, Lollipop released their first television soundtrack.  The band were also part of the cast. Brown Sugar Macchiato OST consists of songs by Hey Girl and Lollipop, including two collaborative songs.

Lollipop's debut album Gyashan (哪裡怕) was released on December 28, 2007. Gyashan entered the Mandarin charts at number one, outselling F4's album Waiting for You – Await Your Love (在這裡等你), which was released on the same day. On January 26, 2008, a year after the release of their first EP, Lollipop held their debut concert at Taipei Arena. The concert DVD was released on 6 June 2008, breaking chart records by taking more than 35% of sales. The DVD topped the charts for a month following its release.

On October 3, 2008, Lollipop released their second television soundtrack.  Some of the members were part of the main cast in the drama, while others had cameo roles. Again, the OST entitled The Legend of Brown Sugar Chivalries is a collaborative work by Hey Girl and Lollipop. Two editions were released for the soundtrack, one being a 10,000 copy limited edition.

Lollipop's second album I am Legend was released on June 19, 2009. A concert tour of Asia of the same name started at the Hong Kong Coliseum on July 4 and 5, 2009.

Lollipop's artist management contract with Channel [V] Taiwan ended at the close of 2009. Former Lollipop members, Qiu Wang Zi and Liao Xiao Jie left the company and created a new group, JPM, with Qiu's brother, Qiu Mao Di. The four remaining band members, Zhuang Ao Quan, Yang Xiao Yu, Liao Wei Lian, and Liu A Wei, re-created the group and called it Lollipop F.

Studio albums

EPs

Singles

Soundtrack contributions

Others

Music Videos

DVDs

Concert Performances

Lollipop's Concerts

Large Concerts

Guest Appearances

See also
 Lollipop F
 JPM

References

External links
  Lollipop F@Gold Typhoon
  JPM at Sony Music

Discographies of Taiwanese artists
Mandopop discographies